Paralamyctes subicolus is a species of centipede in the Henicopidae family. It is endemic to Australia. It was first described in 2004 by palaeontologist Gregory Edgecombe.

Distribution
The species occurs only in the Australian island state of Tasmania. The type locality is Stephens Rivulet, a tributary of the Arthur River, near Trowutta in North West Tasmania.

Behaviour
The centipedes are solitary terrestrial predators that inhabit plant litter and soil.

References

 

 
subicolus
Centipedes of Australia
Endemic fauna of Australia
Fauna of Tasmania
Animals described in 2004
Taxa named by Gregory Edgecombe